Present is a time that is neither future nor past, happening now

Present or The Present or Presents may also refer to:
 Gift, something given free of charge, gratis

Time and timing 
 Present tense, a grammatical tense of a verb
 Before Present, radiocarbon dates relative to AD 1950
 Presenting, a medical term
 Presenteeism, meaning working while sick
 Voting "present", a form of abstention in parliamentary procedure

Film and television
The Present, a 2009 surf film by Thomas Campbell (visual artist)
The Present (2014 film), a German animated short film by Jacob Frey
The Present (2020 film), a Palestinian short film
"The Present" (The Flash), an episode of The Flash
"The Present", an episode of Minority Report, 2015

Print media
Present, a 1997 poetry collection by Alfred Corn
The Present, a 1975 novel by Gabriel Josipovici
The Present, a 1998 romance novel by Johanna Lindsey
The Present: The Secret to Enjoying Your Work And Life, Now!, self help book by Spencer Johnson
Présent, a French right-wing newspaper

Music 
 The Present, a New York based duo featuring Mina Ohashi, who previously performed under the name Fayray
 Present (band), a Belgian progressive rock group

Albums
 Present (Bonnie Pink album), 2003
 Present (Donghae & Eunhyuk EP), 2015
 Present (Killing Heidi album), 2002
 Present (Timbaland & Magoo album), 2005
 Present (Van der Graaf Generator album), 2005
 Present (Yuki Uchida album), 1997
 Present, a 2011 album by Japanese singer Shizuka Itō
 Present, a 2018 album by South Korean singers Woo Jin-young and Kim Hyun-soo
 The Present (Moody Blues album), 1983
 Presents (album), a 2002 album by Maki Ohguro
 Presents, a 1998 album by My Little Lover
 Presents, a 2007 album by 10 Foot Ganja Plant

Songs
 "Present", an English-language version of the 2011 Eurovision contest entry "Jestem" Magdalena Tul's
 "Present", a 2021 song by American singer Khalid
 "Presents", instrumental by Tom Waits from One from the Heart

Other uses
 Present (Aitken) a sculpture in Washington, D.C, by Robert Ingersoll Aitken
 PRESENT (cipher), an ultra-lightweight block cipher algorithm
 The Present, a 2015 stage adaptation of Anton Chekhov's play Platonov, brought to Broadway in 2016

See also 
 Presence (disambiguation)
 Presentation (disambiguation)
 Gift (disambiguation)
 Now (disambiguation)

pt:Presente